The French destroyer Arabe was one of a dozen s built for the French Navy in Japan during the First World War.

Design and description
The ships displaced  at normal load. They were powered by three vertical triple-expansion steam engines, each driving one propeller shaft using steam provided by four mixed-firing Kampon Yarrow-type boilers. During their sea trials, the Arabe class reached . Their crew consisted of 5 officers and 104 crewmen.

The main armament of the Arabe-class ships was a single Type 41  gun, mounted before the bridge on the forecastle. Their secondary armament consisted of four Type 41  guns in single mounts; two of these were positioned abreast the middle funnel and the others were on the centerline further aft. One of these latter guns was on a high-angle mount and served as an anti-aircraft gun. The ships carried two above-water twin mounts for  torpedo tubes. In 1917–18, a rack for eight  depth charges was added.

Construction and career
Arabe was ordered from Kure Naval Arsenal and was launched in 1917 and completed later that year. She was stricken on 14 June 1936 and subsequently broken up for scrap.

Citations

References

External links
naval-history.net

1917 ships
Arabe-class destroyers
Ships built by Kure Naval Arsenal